Orthogonius capucinus is a species of ground beetle in the subfamily Orthogoniinae. It was described by Boheman in 1848.

References

capucinus
Beetles described in 1848